The United States secretary of commerce (SecCom) is the head of the United States Department of Commerce. The secretary serves as the principal advisor to the president of the United States on all matters relating to commerce. The secretary reports directly to the president and is a statutory member of Cabinet of the United States. The secretary is appointed by the president, with the advice and consent of the United States Senate. The secretary of commerce is concerned with promoting American businesses and industries; the department states its mission to be "to foster, promote, and develop the foreign and domestic commerce".

Until 1913, there was one secretary of commerce and labor, uniting this department with the United States Department of Labor, which is now headed by a separate United States secretary of labor.

Secretary of Commerce is a Level I position in the Executive Schedule with an annual salary of US$221,400, as of January 2021.

The current secretary of commerce is former Governor of Rhode Island Gina Raimondo, who was sworn in on March 3, 2021.

List of U.S. Secretaries of Commerce
 Parties
 (1)
 (20)
 (18)
 Status

Line of succession
The line of succession for the secretary of commerce is as follows:

 Deputy Secretary of Commerce
 General Counsel of the Department of Commerce
 Under Secretary of Commerce for International Trade
 Under Secretary of Commerce for Economic Affairs
 Under Secretary of Commerce for Standards and Technology
 Under Secretary of Commerce for Oceans and Atmosphere and Administrator of the National Oceanic and Atmospheric Administration
 Under Secretary of Commerce for Export Administration
 Chief Financial Officer of the Department of Commerce and Assistant Secretary of Commerce for Administration
 Boulder Laboratories Site Manager, National Institute of Standards and Technology

References

External links
 

|-

Commerce
 
Commerce
1913 establishments in the United States